Fryxell is a surname. It is most commonly used in Sweden and America. Notable people with the surname include:

Anders Fryxell (1795–1881), Swedish historian
Fritiof Fryxell (1900–1986), American geologist and mountaineer
Greta Fryxell, (1926–2017), American marine scientist 
Paul Fryxell (1927–2011), American botanist
Regina Fryxell (1899–1993), composer of Lutheran hymns
Roald H. Fryxell (1934–1974), American geologist and archaeologist

See also
Fryxell (crater), a lunar crater
Lake Fryxell in Antarctica